Miller v Minister of Mines [1962] NZPC 1; [1962] UKPC 30; [1963] AC 484; [1963] NZLR 560; [1963] 2 WLR 92; [1963] 1 All ER 109 is a cited case in New Zealand regarding property law.

References

Property law of New Zealand